Adi Badri may refer to:
 Adi Badri, Haryana, a forest area and archaeological site in Yamunanagar district, Haryana, India
 Adi Badri, Uttarakhand, a Hindu temple in  Garhwal Himalayas, Uttarakhand, India